"Hiawatha (A Summer Idyl)" is a song written by Neil Moret (Charles N. Daniels) in 1901. James J. O'Dea (1870–1914) added lyrics in 1903 and the music was re-subtitled "(His Song to Minnehaha)".

"Hiawatha" sold half a million copies after release. It has been recorded numerous times and started a decade long fad for "Indian" songs.

"Hiawatha" was named for Hiawatha, Kansas, not for Longfellow's poem.

Lyrics
The lyrics as written by O'Dea:

References

Bibliography
Jasen, David A. Tin Pan Alley: An Encyclopedia of the Golden Age of American Song. New York: Routledge (2003).
Moret, Neil (m.). "Hiawatha (A Summer Idyl)" (Sheet music). Detroit: Whitney-Warner Pub. Co. (1902).
O'Dea, James J. (w.) (1870–1914); Moret, Neil (m.). "Hiawatha (His Song to Minnehaha)" (Sheet music). Detroit: Whitney-Warner Pub. Co. (1903).
Sanjek, Russell. American Popular Music and Its Business: The First four Hundred Years, Vol. II. New York: Oxford University Press (1988).
Parlor Songs 1800-1920 (Aug 2000). ">Parlor Songs Association.

External links
"Hiawatha", Columbia Orchestra (Columbia Phonograph Co. 32092, (c. 1903)—Cylinder Preservation and Digitization Project.
"Hiawatha", Edison Grand Concert Band (Edison Gold Moulded 8347, (c. 1906)—Cylinder Preservation and Digitization Project.

Songs about Native Americans
1901 songs
Songs about Kansas
Songs with music by Charles N. Daniels (music)